Meligramma triangulifera is a European species of hoverfly. It was described by Zetterstedt in 1843.

References

Diptera of Europe
Syrphinae
Syrphini
Insects described in 1843